Joseph Charles Wildsmith (born 28 December 1995) is an English professional footballer who plays as a goalkeeper for Derby County.

Club career

Sheffield Wednesday
Born in Sheffield, Wildsmith began his football career at boyhood club Sheffield Wednesday. Wildsmith signed a -year professional contract with Sheffield Wednesday in November 2013 after impressing with the club's youth teams. During the 2014–15 season, Wildsmith was named as an unused substitute for four matches.

Wildsmith made his Owls debut in Wednesday's 4–1 League Cup win over Mansfield Town at Hillsborough on 11 August 2015. On 28 August 2015, he signed a new two-year contract with the club keeping him until the summer of 2017. Two weeks later on 15 September 2015, Wildsmith kept his first clean sheet, in a 0–0 draw against Bolton Wanderers. He then made further League cup starts against Premier League giants Newcastle United and Arsenal, claiming clean sheets and wins over both teams. Wildsmith broke into the first-team under new manager Carlos Carvalhal, as Keiren Westwood was injured and Chris Kirkland had left for Preston North End. As a result, he made his return to the starting line–up as a first choice goalkeeper, keeping a clean sheet, in a 3–0 win against Birmingham City. This was followed up by starting in the next three matches, including earning his fourth clean sheet of the season against Fulham on 2 January 2016. However, Wildsmith suffered a back injury that kept him out for two months. After recovering from injury, he returned to the substitute bench and didn't make an appearance until on 9 April 2016, starting the whole game, in a 4–1 loss against Bristol City. At the end of the 2015–16 season, Wildsmith went on to make fourteen appearances in all competitions.

Ahead of the 2016–17 season Wildsmith was featured in the two out of the five pre–season matches for the side. He made his first appearance of the season, starting and played 120 minutes, in a 2–1 loss against Cambridge United in the first round of the League Cup. However, Wildsmith found himself as the club's second choice goalkeeper and placed on the substitute bench throughout the season, even he faced his own injury concern. Despite, Wildsmith appeared two times against Middlesbrough and Fulham. At the end of the 2016–17 season, he made three appearances for the side in all competitions. Following this, the club opted to take up their option of a contract extension that would ensure Wildsmith  remained under contract for the 2017–18 season.

At the start of the 2017–18 season, Wildsmith appeared in three matches (playing once in the league and twice in the League Cup). He then signed a five year contract with Sheffield Wednesday, keeping him until 2022. Wildsmith then made his return to the starting line–up against Birmingham City on 27 September 2017, as they lost 1–0. Following this, he started in the next two matches, including earning a clean sheet against Leeds United on 1 October 2017. After spending two months returning to the substitute bench, Wildsmith didn't return to the starting line–up until on 15 December 2017 against Wolverhampton Wanderers, losing 1–0. Since returning to the first team, he regained his first choice goalkeeper role for the rest of the season. Wildsmith then kept four consecutive clean sheets for the club between 6 January 2018 and 30 January 2018. Wildsmith continued to remain as the club's first choice goalkeeper until he was dropped in favour of Cameron Dawson for the remaining matches of the 2017–18 season. At the end of the 2017–18 season, Wildsmith made twenty–nine appearances in all competitions.

Ahead of the 2018–19 season, Wildsmith said he was ready to fight for his place for the first choice goalkeeper role. However, Manager Jos Luhukay stated while he preferred Cameron Dawson as the first choice keeper in the league, though he would put Wildsmith as a keeper in cup competitions. Luhukay eventually did put Wildsmith in goal for the League matches, starting against Sunderland and Wolverhampton Wanderers. However, he spent the rest of the 2018–19 season, placed on the substitute bench, with Dawson and Westwood preferred to be used in goal under both Luhukay and Steve Bruce and made two appearances in all competitions.
 
Ahead of the 2019–20 season, Wildsmith was linked with a move away from Sheffield Wednesday, but he remained at the club. However, Wildsmith suffered a knock and was substituted during a 2–1 loss against VfB Lübeck in a friendly match on 19 July 2019. As a result, he was sidelined for almost the rest of 2019. By December, Wildsmith returned from injury and then assigned to the substitute bench for the next four months for the side. It wasn't until on 4 March 2020 when he made his first appearance of the season, in a 1–0 loss against Manchester City in the fifth round of the FA Cup. Once the season resumed behind closed doors because of the COVID-19 pandemic, Wildsmith returned to the first team on 20 June 2020 against Nottingham Forest, in a 1–1 draw. For the remaining matches of the 2019–20 season, he became the club's first choice goalkeeper. Wildsmith then kept two consecutive clean sheets between 11 July 2020 and 14 July 2020. At the end of the 2019–20 season, he went on to make ten appearances in all competitions.

Following the end of the 2021-22 season, the club confirmed they had offered Wildsmith a new contract. On 22 June 2022, it was confirmed that he had rejected the offer and would leave the club.

Loan Spells
On 29 March 2014, Wildsmith was loaned out to Alfreton Town for the rest of the 2013–14 season. It wasn't until on 21 April 2014 when he made his debut for the club, starting the whole game, as they lost 3–2 against Hereford United. His second appearance for Alfreton Town came on 26 April 2014 against Macclesfield Town, coming on as a 64th-minute substitute for Jon Worsnop and conceded the only goal of the game, as they lost 1–0. Wildsmith made two appearances for the club.

In March 2015, Wildsmith signed for Barnsley on an emergency one-month loan deal, making his professional debut on 28 March against Bristol City. He went on to make two appearances for the club.

Derby County
On 2 July 2022, Wildsmith joined Derby County on a free transfer.

International career
Throughout 2014 and 2015, Wildsmith was called up to the England U20 squad. He made his England U20 debut on 7 October 2015, starting the whole game, in a 3–1 win against Netherlands U20.

Wildsmith was called up into the England under-21 national squad on three occasions, but never made an appearance for the U21 side.

Career statistics

References

External links
England profile at The Football Association

1995 births
Living people
English footballers
Footballers from Sheffield
England youth international footballers
Association football goalkeepers
Sheffield Wednesday F.C. players
Alfreton Town F.C. players
Barnsley F.C. players
Derby County F.C. players
English Football League players
National League (English football) players